Luxembourg competed at the 1992 Summer Paralympics in Barcelona, Spain. 2 competitors from Luxembourg won no medals and so did not place in the medal table.

See also 
 Luxembourg at the Paralympics
 Luxembourg at the 1992 Summer Olympics

References 

Nations at the 1992 Summer Paralympics
1992
Summer Paralympics